Candidate Eligibility Review Committee is a government statutory committee in Hong Kong, which is responsible for accessing and validating the eligibility of electoral candidate of Chief Executive, Legislative Council and Election Committee.

All electoral candidate of Chief Executive Officer, Legislative Council and also the Election Committee must be approved by the committee before run for election since June 2021.

The member of the Candidate Eligibility Review Committee including a chairperson, 2 to 4 official members, and 1 to 3 non-official members.  The committee members (including the chairperson) are appointed by the Hong Kong Chief Executive by notice published in the Hong Kong Government Gazette.

The committee is established in 2021 as required by the Basic Law after March 30, 2021.

The decision made by the committee on National Security's review advice is not subject to any judicial proceedings.

See also 
 2021 Hong Kong electoral changes
 Public Offices (Candidacy and Taking Up Offices) (Miscellaneous Amendments) Ordinance 2021

References

Related Documents (In English)

Related Documents (In Chinese) 

 
 
 
 
 
 
 
 
 
 
 
 
 
 
 

2021 establishments in Hong Kong
Elections in Hong Kong